Middle Foster Lake is a lake of Saskatchewan, Canada. It is primarily traveled to for fishing or lodging

See also
List of lakes of Saskatchewan

References

Statistics Canada
Anglersatlas.com

Lakes of Saskatchewan